Trader-Price is an American country music group from Burns Flat, Oklahoma composed of brothers Dan, Chris and Erick Trader-Price and Don Bell. In 1989, Trader-Price charted two singles on the Billboard Hot Country Singles & Tracks chart. Two of their singles also charted on the RPM Country Tracks chart in Canada in 1990. A music video was filmed for their single "Lately Rose".

Discography

Albums

Singles

Music videos

References

External links
[ Trader-Price] on Allmusic
Trader-Price on Myspace

Country music groups from Oklahoma
Capitol Records artists